Mnemonist Orchestra is the eponymously titled debut studio album of the free improvisation ensemble Mnemonist Orchestra, released in 1979 by Dys Records.

Background
The album was recorded in March 1979 by a group of friends and collaborators coming from diverse backgrounds, including musicians, visual artists, and scientists. Interested in the possibilities of spontaneous interaction among a diverse group, they intended the album to be an exploration of the effects of technological saturation on society, particularly upon children. The music drew heavily from musique concrète and film music, both of which would continue to influence the ensemble's future works.

Track listing

Personnel 
Adapted from the Mnemonist Orchestra liner notes.

Mnemonist Orchestra
 Steve Chaffey – drums, percussion
 John Herdt – electric guitar, percussion (A2, B2)
 Torger Hougen – spoken word, illustrations
 Bruce McGregor – tape, conducting, photography, illustrations
 Dave Mowers – trombone, percussion
 Hugh Ragin – trumpet, percussion
 Steve Scholbe – alto saxophone
 William Sharp – tape, conducting, arrangements, production, cover art, design, piano (A2), 5-string electric guitar (B1)
 Randy Yeates – spoken word, illustrations

Additional musicians
 Dave Calvin – bass guitar (B1, B2)
 Dave Marsh – bass guitar (A1, A2)
 Nicki Relic – piano (A1, B1, B2), spoken word (A1)
Production and additional personnel
 Mark Derbyshire – engineering

Release history

References

External links 
 Mnemonist Orchestra at Discogs (list of releases)

1979 debut albums
Biota (band) albums